William Henry Blair Jr. (born May 17, 1942) is an American retired basketball coach. Blair worked twenty seasons in the National Basketball Association, beginning in New Jersey with the New Jersey Nets, and continuing to the Chicago Bulls, under Kevin Loughery, helping to draft Michael Jordan.  He then moved to the Washington Bullets under Wes Unseld, and next the Indiana Pacers under Larry Brown—coaching spectacular teams with Reggie Miller at the helm.  In 1993, he became the head coach of the Minnesota Timberwolves, then returned to the Pacers, and finally finished his career under Randy Whitman at the Cleveland Cavaliers.

Blair is a 1960 graduate of Randolph-Macon Academy where he starred on the best basketball team the school ever had.  He made the starting five as a sophomore and was the high scorer his senior year in a season when they lost only one game which he and three other starters missed. When next they played the same school they doubled their opponent's point total.  He scored 49 points in one game which is the school record. He played college ball at VMI where he led them to their first NCAA appearance in 32 years as their high scorer. In 1964 Blair was drafted by the St. Louis Hawks in the 4th round, but had to complete his military service of two years. While in the Army serving in Korea, he played AND coached the 8th Army Division team which won the Korean championship and the Asian-Pacific Championship in Okinawa. He toured with the Army All Star team and won the Armed Forces Inter-service championships in 1966.

After two stints at Virginia high schools, he returned to VMI as an assistant, then a head coach. Blair led the Keydets to an NCAA tournament berth and an Elite 8 appearance. After a five-year stint with the Colorado Buffaloes, he moved on to the NBA. He is now retired and enjoying life with his family. Coach Bill Blair is the ONLY college coach to both play in and coach the same team to the Southern Conference Championship and the NCAA tournament.  He played (and Captained) VMI in 1964 and let them to the Southern Conference Championship and into the NCAA tournament, then returned as the Head Coach and in 1976 led them to the Southern Conference Championship and to the "Elite Eight" in the NCAA Tournament.

Head coaching record

College

NBA

|-
| style="text-align:left;"|New Jersey
| style="text-align:left;"|
|6||2||4||.333|| style="text-align:center;"|3rd in Atlantic||–||–||–||–
| style="text-align:center;"|L New York 0–2
|-
| style="text-align:left;"|Minnesota
| style="text-align:left;"|
|82||21||61||.256|| style="text-align:center;"|6th in Midwest||–||–||–||–
| style="text-align:center;"|Missed playoffs
|-
| style="text-align:left;"|Minnesota
| style="text-align:left;"|
|20||6||14||.300|| style="text-align:center;"|(fired)||–||–||–||–
| style="text-align:center;"|–
|- class="sortbottom"
| style="text-align:left;"|Career
| ||108||29||79||.269|| ||–||–||–||–

References

1942 births
Living people
American men's basketball players
Basketball coaches from Kentucky
Basketball players from Kentucky
Chicago Bulls assistant coaches
Cleveland Cavaliers assistant coaches
College men's basketball head coaches in the United States
Colorado Buffaloes men's basketball coaches
High school basketball coaches in Virginia
Indiana Pacers assistant coaches
Minnesota Timberwolves head coaches
New Jersey Nets assistant coaches
New Jersey Nets head coaches
St. Louis Hawks draft picks
VMI Keydets basketball coaches
VMI Keydets basketball players
Washington Bullets assistant coaches